The  is a Japanese man-portable fire-and-forget anti-tank missile. Development began in 1993 at Kawasaki Heavy Industries and was accepted into service in 2001. During development, the missile was designated with the codename XATM-5. Later it was known briefly as the: ATM-5.

In the 1st Airborne Brigade, it is used as its main anti-armor weapon.

History

As a replacement was needed for the Sumitomo FT-84 recoilless rifle in front-line service with the Japanese Ground Self-Defense Forces, plans to replace it with an Infrared homing anti-tank missile was commissioned by the Defense Agency's Technical Research and Development Institute. In 1993, Kawasaki Heavy Industries was selected to create the said anti-tank missile system. In trials conducted by the JGSDF, the system was known as the XATM-5. The system was created in the same year with live testing in 1996.

Requirements for the system included portability, usage by a single soldier and design-to-cost technology.

In 2001, after 11 years, it was finally placed into service with the Japanese Ground Self-Defense Forces as the Type 01 LMAT which translates from Japanese to Type 01 light anti-tank guided missile. A report filed by the Ministry of Defense in 2005 called for acquisition of an unknown number of 01 LMAT missile systems among various military items purchased from Kawasaki Heavy Industries for 129,700,000,000 Yen.

Design
This weapon employs a sophisticated Command Launch Unit (CLU) that is re-loaded for multiple firings. It is not of the disposable (one-shot) type.

The LMAT's missile warhead is tandem HEAT, its two-stage warhead making it effective against ERA protected vehicles.

Application
The Type 01 LMAT, while used for infantry in anti-tank roles, can be mounted on the Komatsu LAV for a mobile anti-tank platform.

Operators
: 1073 Sets (2010)

Similar weapons 
 FGM-148 Javelin
 HJ-12
 Missile Moyenne Portée
 MPATGM
 OMTAS
 Spike-MR/LR

See also
 Type 64 MAT
 Type 79 Jyu-MAT
 Type 87 Chu-MAT

References

Notes 
  Kenkyusha's New Japanese-English Dictionary, Kenkyusha Limited, Tokyo 1991,

External links

 Official JGSDF Page
 Type 01 LAMAT vs FGM-48 JAVELIN high quality video

Post–Cold War anti-tank missiles of Japan
Japan Ground Self-Defense Force
Military equipment introduced in the 2000s
Fire-and-forget weapons
Kawasaki Heavy Industries